Trafalgar House  was a British conglomerate with interests in property investment, property development, engineering, construction, shipping, hotels, energy and publishing. It was listed on the London Stock Exchange and was a constituent of the FTSE 100 Index but eventually floundered in the mid-1990s.

History
Trafalgar House was founded by entrepreneur Nigel Broackes, whose interests in share dealing and small scale property development brought him into contact with the directors of the Eastern International Investment Trust, a small trust quoted on the London Stock Exchange. In 1959, Broackes acquired a 42 per cent holding in Eastern's property subsidiary, Eastern International Property Investments (EIPI). Two years later, Broackes formed a relationship with Commercial Union which bought shares in EIPI and prepared to act as a financial backer for new property developments. Almost immediately EIPI bought a 55 per cent stake in CU's residential property subsidiary Westminster & Kensington Freeholds, thereby acquiring control of a property portfolio of £3.3m for an equity cost of only £550.

In 1963, Trafalgar House was floated on the London Stock Exchange with Commercial Union owning 46 per cent and Broackes 21 per cent. The existence of a public quotation enabled Trafalgar House to issue shares for acquisitions and Broackes made extensive use of that facility for the company to become a formidable international industrial and commercial undertaking. According to The Daily Telegraph, Broackes embarked on "a string of construction and engineering acquisitions which established the core of a corporate group – and which gained Broackes the reputation for being a financier with an exceptional flair for victory in the cut and thrust of business life."

An acquisition with significant long term consequences was a 49% share of Bridge Walker in 1964 (increased to full ownership in 1967). Bridge Walker had been carrying out much of Trafalgar's construction work but apart from giving Trafalgar House its own contracting experience, the deal also brought in the owner, Victor Matthews, later to become Trafalgar's group managing director. With him and Broackes working together, acquisitions became high-profile. In that same year Trafalgar House bought Ideal Homes; Ideal had been the largest private house builder before the war and was once again expanded under its new ownership. The long-established London contractor, Trollope & Colls, was acquired at the end of the year.

For twenty years Trafalgar House continued to expand, with acquisitions again playing a major role. In construction and engineering these included The Cementation Company, John Brown Engineering, Cleveland Bridge and Redpath Dorman Long. Housebuilding saw the acquisition of two top ten housebuilders, Comben Homes and Broseley Homes. Trafalgar’s property development had led to the purchase of hotels but the high-profile acquisition was of the Ritz Hotel in 1976. Trafalgar also entered fields that were far removed from its original property development and construction roots with the purchase of Cunard in 1971 and Beaverbrook's Express Newspapers in 1976. Matthews' attentions were largely focussed on Express and this was floated as a separate entity in 1982 with Matthews as chairman.

In the course of thirty years or so, Trafalgar House became a formidable international industrial and commercial undertaking. During the final few years of its existence, it was consistently tabled as the largest contracting organisation in the UK.

Divisions or operating areas
A conglomerate by nature is usually a dynamic entity and fluid in its structure and content. For the purpose of this historical perspective a general indication only is given of the scope of industries, operations and companies embraced by Trafalgar House during its existence.

Hotels
The Ritz Hotel in London, which was acquired by Trafalgar House in 1976, was later sold to David & Frederick Barclay for £75 million in 1995.

Property
In 1980 there was public outcry at the sudden destruction by Trafalgar House of the Art Deco main entrance to the former Firestone tyre factory (designed by Wallis, Gilbert & Partners, 1928–29) in Brentford, which had been torn down over the August bank holiday weekend to (legally) pre-empt and thus nullify an imminent preservation order under the listed buildings legislation. The company was due to embark on the West Cross Development, an extensive redevelopment of the large industrial site, which would have been seriously hampered by a requirement to maintain both the lengthy architectural facade of the old factory and its broad approach sightlines and boundary features.

In 1988 Trafalgar House was involved in a joint development with British Aerospace to redevelop the former Royal Small Arms Factory site at Enfield.

In 1995 it bought the bomb-damaged site of the historic Baltic Exchange building, at 30 St Mary Axe in London, which had been severely damaged when the Provisional Irish Republican Army detonated a bomb nearby on 10 April 1992. The building's former owner, the Baltic Exchange, was unable to bear the costs of fully restoring the building to English Heritage's requirements and sold the site to Trafalgar House. In 1998 the site was resold, with planning permission, for £81 million to Swiss Re, who commissioned and occupied the renowned Gherkin building, designed by Foster + Partners.

Housebuilding
Trafalgar bought Ideal Homes in 1967. It had been the pre-eminent private housebuilder before the war with sales of over 5,000 houses a year but by the time of the acquisition it was building little more than 1,000 a year. New management enabled Ideal to grow again and the size of the division was increased by the acquisition of two other large housebuilders – Comben Homes in 1984 and Broseley Homes in 1986. By 1987 Ideal was again selling around 5,000 houses a year.

Shipping
Trafalgar House acquired the Cunard group of shipping and leisure companies in 1971. Cunard operated cargo and passenger ships, hotels and resorts. At that time it had forty-two cargo ships in service, with fourteen more under construction; and three passenger ships, with two more under construction. But twelve years later the cargo fleet had shrunk to eighteen, half of which were by then container ships. The size of the passenger fleet had remained constant. In 1989 Trafalgar House withdrew Cunard from the cargo shipping industry and sold off all its freighters.

Construction
In 1964, Trafalgar House bought 49 percent of Bridge Walker (increased to full ownership in 1967). At the end of the following year it bought Trollope & Colls. From then on the prime umbrella operating division, in terms of turnover and revenue, was Trafalgar House Construction – generally referred to both inside the company and within the industry as 'THC'. As the division grew in scope and stature it was responsible for more and more large international projects.

Engineering
In 1986, Trafalgar House acquired John Brown Engineering, which built industrial gas turbines and also implemented licensed processes, such as the Union Carbide Corporation Polyethylene Plant. The basic processes were engineered to fit the purchaser's requirements, including the site plan, the production capacity, the raw material feedstock, and other constraints. John Brown Engineering had been the engineering division of the shipbuilder John Brown & Company of Clydebank.

In 1989 Trafalgar House purchased a 40% shareholding in British Rail Engineering Limited. This was sold in 1992 to fellow shareholder Asea Brown Boveri.

In 1992, Trafalgar House acquired the Davy Corporation, a group of international engineering companies which also included a well-established UK wide construction division.

Decline and disposal
As the 1990 recession approached, Trafalgar continued to invest heavily: some £750m had been invested in commercial property alone between 1988 and the first half of 1990. Moreover, interest was not being charged to the profit and loss account but capitalised, and substantial borrowings were being carried off the balance sheet. In 1991, the Financial Reporting Review Panel threatened to apply for a court order that would require Trafalgar to charge a £142.5 million reduction in asset values through the profit and loss account rather than through reserves, which eventually led to directors restating their 1992 accounts from a £112.5 million profit to a £30 million loss. Massive provisions led to a £347m loss in 1993 and Trafalgar itself became a takeover target.

Trafalgar's far-east associates, Jardine Matheson, invested in Trafalgar House and took fifteen percent of the company: later increasing to twenty-five percent. The vehicle used for this investment was Jardine's property subsidiary Hong Kong Land. Jardines are controlled by the Keswick family, a dynasty of Scottish origin. Simon Keswick took the chair at Trafalgar House in 1994 but the company fortunes continued to slide.

On 18 April 1996, Norwegian shipbuilding and engineering group Kværner acquired Trafalgar House plc following a £904 million offer. The acquisition provided Kvaerner with a broad-based portfolio of companies with 34,000 staff.

References

Conglomerate companies of the United Kingdom
Property companies of the United Kingdom
Companies formerly listed on the London Stock Exchange
Defunct companies based in London
British companies established in 1963
Construction and civil engineering companies of the United Kingdom
1963 establishments in England
1996 disestablishments in England
British companies disestablished in 1996
Construction and civil engineering companies disestablished in the 20th century